The mayor of Milan is the first citizen and head of the municipal government of the city of Milan, Lombardy, Italy.

The current office holder is Giuseppe Sala, a centre-left independent who has been in charge since 2016 leading a progressive alliance composed by the Democratic Party, Green Europe and some civic lists. The last election took place in 2021.

Overview

According to the Italian Constitution, the mayor of Milan is a member of the Milan's City Council. The mayor and the other 48 city councilors (consiglieri comunali) are elected by the Italian and EU citizens residing in Milan. Concurrently, albeit with a different ballot paper, nine presidents and 270 councilors are chosen for the nine assemblies of the nine municipalities, often referred to as zones, in which the city is divided, each one having one president and 30 councilors. All the offices are elected for five-year terms.

After the election, the mayor can appoint one vice mayor (currently Anna Scavuzzo) and up to 16 assessors; together they form the municipal government (giunta comunale) and they implement the municipal policies, which are determined and controlled by the City Council. The City Council has also the power to dismiss the mayor or any of the assessors with a motion of no confidence. Similar procedures take place at the municipality level, where the mayor is called president of the municipality (presidente del municipio) and there are three assessors.

Since 1993, Italian mayors of municipalities of more than 15,000 inhabitants are directly elected by their respective electorates. Voters can express their choice for the mayor and for a list of municipal councilors not necessarily supporting the same mayor-candidate (voto disgiunto). If no mayor-candidate receives a majority of votes, a run-off election is held two weeks later among the top two candidates. In the list choice, each voter can express one or two preferences for councilor-candidates; in case of two preferences, their gender must be different. The party and civic lists supporting the elected mayor are granted a majority of the City Council seats, divided proportionally to each list result, by means of a majority bonus; the remaining seats are then assigned proportionally to the opposition lists.

The official seat of the mayor and of the City Council is Milan's City Hall, Palazzo Marino, in Piazza della Scala (Municipality 1). Each municipality has its own official seat as well, within its respective territory.

List

Rectors

Mayors

Kingdom of Italy (1860–1946)

Italian Republic (1946–present)

City Council election (1946–1993)
From 1946 to 1993, the mayor of Milan was chosen by the City Council.

Notes

Direct election (since 1993)
Since 1993, under provisions of new local administration law, the mayor of Milan is chosen by direct election, originally every four, and since 2001 every five years.

Notes

Timeline

By time in office

Elections

Deputy Mayor
The office of the Deputy Mayor of Milan was officially created in 1993 with the adoption of the new local administration law. The Deputy Mayor is nominated and eventually dismissed by the Mayor. 

Notes

See also
List of rulers of Milan
Timeline of Milan

References

External links 
Official website (in English)

 
Milan
Milan-related lists